Calle Real is a 1983 album by Andalusian flamenco singer Camarón, with the collaboration of Paco de Lucía and Tomatito.

Track listing

"Romance de la Luna" – 4:05
"Esclavo de Tus Besos" – 4:18
"Yo Vivo Enamorao" – 4:01
"Yo Soy el Viento" – 3:23
"Calle Real" – 3:31
"Ná Es Eterno" – 5:36
"Caminando" – 3:04
"Bulerías de la Perla" – 4:25

Personnel 
Camarón - Vocals
Paco de Lucia - Guitar
Tomatito - Guitar
Carles Benavent - Electric Bass
Raimundo Amador - Percussion
Rubem Dantas - Percussion

See also
Calle Real (disambiguation)
Calle Real (band)

1983 albums
Camarón de la Isla albums
Paco de Lucía albums